Blossom Hill can mean:

Blossom Hill (wine), a wine brand owned by Treasury Wine Estates
Blossom Hill (VTA), a station in California
Blossom Hill (Caltrain station), a station in San Jose, California
Blossom Hill (Georgia), a summit in Georgia
Blossom Hill Road, a road in California
Blossom Hill (plantation), a plantation in Kentucky
a school in Los Gatos Union School District, California